Epibulia is a genus of hydrozoans belonging to the family Rhizophysidae.

The species of this genus are found in Northern America.

Species:

Epibulia erythrophysa 
Epibulia ritteriana

References

Rhizophysidae
Hydrozoan genera